Pat, Paddy or Patrick Jackson may refer to:

Patrick Tracy Jackson (1780–1847), American manufacturer
Pat Jackson (1916–2011), English film and television director
Pat Jackson (footballer) (1924–1974), English inside forward
Patrick Jackson (cricketer) (born 1984), Australian player for New South Wales
Paddy Jackson (born 1992), Irish rugby player

See also
Patricia Jackson (born 1958), known as Pat, American gold medalist sprinter
Patricia Jackson (Survivor), American contestant in February 2002